White Hills is an unincorporated community and census-designated place (CDP) in Mohave County, Arizona, United States. As of the 2020 census, White Hills had a population of 345.

History
In 1892, Henry Shaffer discovered silver deposits in the area, with the help of local Native Americans. The resulting mining efforts led to the creation of the town of White Hills, which reportedly grew to a population of 1,500. In 1894, the White Hills Mining Company was formed to run the operations, but they sold out in 1895 for a price of $1,500,000. The new owners, part of an English company, constructed a 40-stamp mill in the town. Production peaked in 1898, and soon after the mill began operating only half of the time. The town went into decline, and eventually became a ghost town.

White Hills received media attention in 2014 when Charles Vacca, a shooting instructor, was accidentally shot and killed by a 9-year-old girl at a local gun range.

In 2020, NextEra Energy began construction of a long-planned 127-turbine wind farm in the White Hills area, with initial power output expected by the end of the year. Southern California Clean Power Alliance has a 20-year power purchase agreement for 300 megawatts from the wind farm. See Wind power in Arizona.

Geography
White Hills is in northwestern Mohave County, in the Detrital Valley and at the base of the White Hills, which rise to the east. U.S. Route 93 runs through the west side of the CDP, leading southeast  to Kingman, the Mohave county seat, and northwest  to Las Vegas, Nevada.

Demographics

References

External links

 Mohave Museum of Arts and History entry for White Hills
 Historical Marker Database entry for White Hills
 White Hills – ghosttowns.com

Census-designated places in Mohave County, Arizona
Ghost towns in Arizona
Census-designated places in Arizona
Former populated places in Mohave County, Arizona